Sujoy Parui (born 20 June 1981) is an Indian former cricketer. He played two first-class matches for Bengal in 2000/01.

See also
 List of Bengal cricketers

References

External links
 

1981 births
Living people
Indian cricketers
Bengal cricketers
People from Ahmednagar district